Acanthophila kuznetzovi is a moth in the family Gelechiidae. It is only known from the southern part of Primorsky Krai, Russia.

Description
The wingspan is 12–13 mm. The forewings are brown, with three indistinct dark-brown dots, two of these at the middle and at the end of the 
cell, and the third at the anal fold. There are also two light-grey short strokes and a thicker costal one, as well as a dorsal one before the tornus. 
The hindwings are grey.

Etymology
The species is named for Prof. V.I. Kuznetzov of the Zoological Institute in St. Petersburg.

References

kuznetzovi
Moths described in 1998
Moths of Asia